East Jackson Secondary School is a public high school located in southern Mid-Michigan in the eastern part of Jackson County. It currently contains approximately 580 students, ranging from grades 7th through 12th.  It is the only secondary school in the East Jackson Community Schools district.

Administration
The administration consists of a principal, athletic director/dean of students, and two counselors. The principal is Joel Cook.

Athletics
East Jackson's team name is the Trojans and their mascot is the Trojan man. The Trojans are part of the Cascades Conference, which also includes Michigan Center, Grass Lake, Addison, Hanover Horton, Napoleon, Manchester, and Vandercook Lake. East Jackson is a member in the Michigan High School Athletic Association (MHSSA).

The following sports are offered at East Jackson:

Baseball (boys)
Basketball (girls & boys)
Bowling (girls & boys)
Competitive cheerleading (girls)
Cross country (girls & boys)
Football (boys)
Golf (girls & boys)
Softball (girls)
Track & field (girls & boys)
Volleyball (girls)
Wrestling (boys)

References

External links
 School Districts Website
 School Website

Public high schools in Michigan
Schools in Jackson County, Michigan
Public middle schools in Michigan